Mansura, also spelt Mansoura, is a Syrian village located in Al-Ziyarah Nahiyah in Al-Suqaylabiyah District, Hama.  According to the Syria Central Bureau of Statistics (CBS), it had a population of 770 in the 2004 census.

Syrian Civil War 
During the Syrian Civil War Mansura came under the control of Hayat Tahrir al-Sham. The Syrian Arab Army began shelling the village on August 28, 2018 in preparation for their operation against the last remaining areas under rebel control.

References 

Populated places in al-Suqaylabiyah District